Qarakolluq (also, Karakëlluk) is a village and municipality in the Ismailli Rayon of Azerbaijan.  It has a population of 219.

References 

Populated places in Ismayilli District